Changar or Chingar (چنگھڑ)  (चांगर) are an ancient mysterious vagabond former Hindu tribe of India.

Changars sometimes called Cingân, Tsingan, Chingari, Tsingari, Tschangar etc., are mostly vagabond and speak their own Changhri dialect. According to Johann Galletti and Franz Miklosich and some other early European historians, the Romani People of Europe are closely related to the Changar (German: Tschangar) and are Tschandala.

Origin 
According to Indian and Pakistani Scholars, they are remnants of the Indo-Greeks and Greco-Bactrians, who intermingled with Jats, some of them left India at the time of Migration period and went in different ways to Europe, under the Hindu Caste system, they are considered as Chandala other Groups settling in Rajasthan, with their initial settlement being in the districts of Bikaner, Churu and Nagaur. From there the Changars migrated to Sindh. A further migration then took place to Punjab, where many are still found. They speak a mixed Indo-Aryan language among themselves, and Urdu with outsiders.
Under Mughal Empire, the Changar became Muslims, but their religion is a mix of Hinduism and Islam.

Present circumstances 
The Roma people are descendants more or less of the Changar from Pakistan, as genetic Study shows. Some Changars left Sindh through Egypt in Migration period, and later lived in Anatolia and called in Greek language Athinganoi

In India 
The Changar are largely a landless community, with a few still involved in their traditionally occupation of lime manufacture. Most are now daily wage labourers. Like other Rajasthani Muslims, the community has a caste association or biradari panchayat, which resolves intra community disputes and enforces communal norms. Although the Changhar live in close proximity to other such Muslim castes such as the Hiranbaz, Sindhi-Sipahi and Qaimkhani, intermarriages between them and the Changar are extremely rare. The Changhar are Sunni Muslims, and their customs are similar to other Rajasthani Muslims. They have been granted Other Backward Class status, which makes them subject to a number of affirmative actions policies of the Government of India.

In Pakistan 

The Shamsi (Changar) in Punjab are strictly endogamous, and the basic social unit is the Jhugi or tent (now new generations are mostly educated and have their own houses). Generally it is close kin who camp together, and marriages are preferred within the encampment. They do not have strong caste councils to maintain community norms. Most of the Shamsi called Changar in Pakistan migrated from Indian Jalindher's Tehsil Sultan Poor and District Ludhiana. They spread in all Pakistan. Mostly settled in Chiniot and Faisalabad District. The Changar are Sunni Muslims and either speak Haryanvi Punjabi or Seraiki depending on what language the settled community in which they are camped speaks (Although they speak Parsi language called by one of the old Changar). They speak this language as secret language when they inform some thing secret which each other.  

The majority of the Changars within northern and central Punjab are agricultural labourers, visiting villages during harvest time. They have established routes that they follow, and each Changar sub-group is allocated a particular village, and often serve a particular family in that village. Their patrons tend to belong to the large Muslim Jat community. In addition to agricultural labour, the Changar are also involved in the manufacture of baskets and brooms, which they sell to settled communities. Nowadays only 10% are involving in this work. Many of Shamsi (Changar) are now in good Jobs and local business after getting education. In local Government they have their own Counselors and have Chairmanship. In 1990 many of Shamsi moved toward Dubai for better future, they earn for his family and country now getting part of i community progress.

References 

Muslim communities of Rajasthan
Social groups of Rajasthan
Muslim communities of India
Social groups of Punjab, Pakistan
Punjabi tribes
Saraiki tribes